Yongning Township is a township under the administration of Wanyuan, Sichuan, China. , it has one residential community and six villages under its administration.

References 

Township-level divisions of Sichuan
Wanyuan